Drexel and Company Building, also known as the Drexel Building, is a historic bank building located in the Rittenhouse Square East neighborhood of Philadelphia, Pennsylvania. It was built between 1925 and 1927, and is a six-story, building with basement and penthouse in a Renaissance Palazzo style.  It is faced in ashlar granite and features a rounded entrance portal, low relief zodiac roundels, carved shields, and wrought iron lamps. It was built as headquarters for Drexel and Company, which was subsequently dissolved in the 1930s. It was then occupied by a local bank.

It was added to the National Register of Historic Places in 1980.

References

Bank buildings on the National Register of Historic Places in Philadelphia
Renaissance Revival architecture in Pennsylvania
Commercial buildings completed in 1927
Rittenhouse Square, Philadelphia